James Gibney (14 December 1847 – 25 May 1908) was an Irish Nationalist politician. An Anti-Parnellite, he was an Irish National Federation Member of Parliament (MP) for North Meath from 1893 to 1900.

He was elected to the United Kingdom House of Commons at a by-election on 21 February 1893, after the result of the 1892 general election in North Meath was overturned on petition at the next general election, in 1895, Gibney was re-elected with a narrow majority over the Parnellite candidate John Sweetman. At the 1900 general election, when the Irish Parliamentary Party reunited after its 9-year split, Gibney stood as a Healyite Nationalist and lost seat to the Irish Parliamentary Party candidate Patrick White. Gibney was also a justice of the peace for County Meath.

Personal life
Gibney was born on 14 December 1847 at Beltrasna, Oldcastle, the son of Thomas Gibney. He married firstly Bridget Hennesy (d. 1895), daughter of John Hennesy, Millbrook Mills, Oldcastle, and Castlepollard; and secondly Catharine O'Brien, daughter of Michael O'Brien, Oldtown, Navan. He had issue of two sons and two daughters.

References

External links 
 

1847 births
1908 deaths
Anti-Parnellite MPs
UK MPs 1892–1895
UK MPs 1895–1900
Members of the Parliament of the United Kingdom for County Meath constituencies (1801–1922)